The 2000 ICF World Junior Canoe Slalom Championships were the 8th edition of the ICF World Junior Canoe Slalom Championships. The event took place in Bratislava, Slovakia from 13 to 16 July 2000 under the auspices of the International Canoe Federation (ICF) at the Čunovo Water Sports Centre.

Medal summary

Men

Canoe

Kayak

Women

Kayak

Medal table

References

External links
International Canoe Federation

ICF World Junior Canoe Slalom Championships
ICF World Junior and U23 Canoe Slalom Championships